Legion State Park  is public recreation area located on the north edge of the city of Louisville, Mississippi, and adjacent to Tombigbee National Forest. As Legion State Park Historic District, the state park entered the National Register of Historic Places in 1998. It is managed by the Mississippi Department of Wildlife, Fisheries and Parks.

History
The park is one of the original Mississippi state parks developed by the Civilian Conservation Corps in the 1930s. The CCC began creating the park in October 1934; it opened the public in July 1937. It includes the Legion Lodge, a hand-hewn log structure that has remained unaltered since its construction.

Activities and amenities
The park features fishing on two small lakes ( and ), primitive and developed campsites, cabins and cottages, a  nature trail, picnic area, and CCC-era visitors center.

References

External links
Legion State Park Mississippi Department of Wildlife, Fisheries, and Parks
Friends of Legion Website

State parks of Mississippi
Protected areas of Winston County, Mississippi
Historic districts on the National Register of Historic Places in Mississippi
1937 establishments in Mississippi
Civilian Conservation Corps in Mississippi
National Register of Historic Places in Winston County, Mississippi
Parks on the National Register of Historic Places in Mississippi